Crossing is an album by American world music/jazz group Oregon featuring Ralph Towner, Paul McCandless, Glen Moore, and Collin Walcott which was recorded in 1984 and released on the ECM label.
This was the final album recorded with Walcott, released after his death in November 1984.

Reception
The Allmusic review by  Ron Wynn awarded the album 3 stars, stating, "Ethereal playing with tremendous solos".

Track listing
All compositions by Ralph Towner except as indicated
 "Queen of Sydney" (Paul McCandless) - 8:17 
 "Pepé Linque" (Glen Moore) - 4:21 
 "Alpenbridge" - 6:31 
 "Travel by Day" (Collin Walcott) - 4:23 
 "Kronach Waltz" (Moore) - 3:08 
 "The Glide" - 6:13 
 "Amaryllis" (McCandless) - 8:55 
 "Looking-Glass Man" - 4:26 
 "Crossing" - 3:13 
Recorded at Tonstudio Bauer in Ludwigsburg, West Germany in October 1984

Personnel
Paul McCandless - soprano saxophone  (tracks 2, 6, 8, 9), oboe  (tracks 1, 3, 7), bass clarinet  (tracks 2, 5), English horn  (tracks 7)
Glen Moore - bass (tracks 1–4, 6–9), flute (track 1), piano  (track 5)
Ralph Towner - classical guitar (tracks 3, 9), 12 string guitar (tracks 4, 7), piano (tracks 1, 2, 6, 8, 9), Prophet-5 synthesizer (tracks 1–3, 6, 7, 9), cornet (tracks 2, 5, 6), percussion (track 9)
Collin Walcott - percussion (tracks 1, 2, 6, 7, 9), tabla  (tracks 1, 2, 6), sitar  (tracks 3, 4), bass drum (tracks 5), snare drum (tracks 5)

References

ECM Records albums
Oregon (band) albums
1985 albums
Albums produced by Manfred Eicher